Ian Robinson (born 20 August 1946) is a former Australian rules football field umpire who officiated in the Victorian Football League (VFL).

At the time of his retirement from umpiring in 1987, Robinson held the VFL/AFL record for most senior games officiated as a field umpire (353), of which nine were VFL Grand Finals, second only to Jack Elder. Throughout his career, and later as an umpiring coach and administrator, Robinson was a first-hand witness to some of Australian rules football's most memorable on-field incidents in one of the most tumultuous periods of the sport's history, and his achievements have been recognized with induction in both the Australian Football Hall of Fame and the AFL Umpires Association Hall of Fame.

Umpiring career
Robinson first joined the Umpiring Club at University High School when he was 15 and joined the VFL senior umpiring panel in 1969.

He had reported two players, and revealed that he was not feeling well at half time. After the match he was examined by the Melbourne and St Kilda club doctors before being taken to Allendale Private Hospital by ambulance. He was discharged the following day.

After also umpiring the First Semi-final which Carlton again won by 20 points, Robinson was selected to umpire the 1973 VFL Grand Final.

Robinson umpired his third (and fourth) VFL Grand Final in 1977, this time in tandem with John Sutcliffe. In what became the second drawn Grand Final in VFL/AFL history, he reported Collingwood's Ray Shaw in the first quarter for deliberately striking North defender Ken Montgomery in the stomach with a clenched right fist; Shaw would be cleared to play in the Replay the following week. He was also the umpire who awarded the mark in the dying seconds of the game to Ross Dunne which enabled him to level the scores. As Robinson recalled:

I saw the pack go up and I knew I had to stay focused. It was a huge pack but I saw one pair of hands get a clear purchase on the ball. I blew my whistle...I was determined to keep my concentration focused as I ran in and watched those arms and the ball all the way to the ground. I called ‘It's yours’, and saw it was Ross Dunne who had taken the mark. I do rate it as one of my best decisions. If you don't see it you don't pay it. I saw it.

1987 would turn out to be Robinson's last as a senior VFL umpire. It was a busy one too, officiating in every round of the home-and-away season and also serving as President of the Umpires Association. The final two VFL matches he would officiate in - the 1987 Preliminary final and the Grand final - provided a number of memorable moments, some of which he was directly involved in.
In the last quarter, Melbourne had several clear-cut chances to seal the game but was unable to capitalize, while Hawthorn had kicked three goals to bring the margin back to four points.   
The Grand Final, which Robinson co-officiated with Rowan Sawers (who would eventually overtake Robinson's games record in 1995), was memorable for its unusual beginning; as the opening siren sounded, Carlton midfielder Wayne Johnston became aware that Hawthorn had five players stationed in the centre square (the rules only allow a maximum of four per team) and pointed this out to Robinson as he was about to take the opening bounce. Robinson blew his whistle to start the game, and handed the ball to Johnston to take the free kick. Minutes later, he would report Johnston for striking Hawthorn wingman Robert DiPierdomenico and also ruckman Justin Madden for striking Hawthorn captain Michael Tuck.

Continued Involvement with Umpiring
Immediately following retirement, Robinson remained active in umpiring circles, being appointed to the VFL's umpire coaching panel alongside renowned colleagues Bill Deller and Kevin Smith. Early in the 1988 VFL season the panel summoned umpire Ian Clayton following a controversial incident in which 's Rod Grinter hit Terry Wallace (who had just began a stint with ) in the face with a forearm, resulting in Wallace suffering from concussion and a broken jaw. Grinter also required hospitalisation when one of Wallace's teeth became embedded in his hand and later became infected. The panel questioned Clayton about the incident and why Grinter had not been reported. Clayton was subsequently demoted to umpiring in the Ovens and Murray Football League before returning to VFL duty later in the season, and Grinter eventually was suspended for six weeks.

In 2004, in a bid to improve the consistency of Tribunal rulings, the AFL appointed Robinson to the new position of video reporting officer, becoming the sole person responsible for laying charges based on video evidence, a job that had been previously assigned to the field umpires.

Honours
In 1988, Robinson received the AFL Umpires Association's Lifetime Achievement Award.

When the Australian Football Hall of Fame was established in 1996 to celebrate the centenary of the VFL/AFL, Robinson was listed, along with ten other umpires, among its inaugural inductees.

Life Outside Football
Outside of football, Robinson has worked as a university professor specialising in computer science. He graduated with a Bachelor of Science and PhD from the University of Melbourne and lectured there until moving to La Trobe University in 1975, being one of the original staff members when the Department of Computer Science was formed two years later at the Bundoora campus. As of 2002 he held the title of associate professor at the Department of Computer Science and Computer Engineering, as well as being appointed Deputy Dean of the Faculty of Science, Technology and Engineering.

References

Bibliography

External links
 
 
 

Australian Football Hall of Fame inductees
Australian Football League umpires
Living people
1946 births
People educated at University High School, Melbourne
University of Melbourne alumni sportspeople
VFL/AFL administrators
Academic staff of the University of Melbourne
Academic staff of La Trobe University
Australian computer scientists